Gruzdevka is a rural locality (a village) in Novomedvedevsky Selsoviet, Ilishevsky District, Bashkortostan, Russia. The population was 233 as of 2010. There are 4 streets.

Geography 
Gruzdevka is located 32 km north of Verkhneyarkeyevo (the district's administrative centre) by road. Novomedvedevo is the nearest rural locality.

References 

Rural localities in Ilishevsky District